French woman may refer to:

 Women in France
 The French Woman, a 1977 French film
 A French Woman, a 1995 French film

See also
 French Women (film), a 2014 French film